The 1960 Claxton Shield was the 21st annual Claxton Shield, it was held in Sydney, New South Wales. The participants were South Australia, New South Wales, Victoria, Western Australia and Queensland. The series was won by South Australia, claiming their sixth Shield title.

References

1960 in baseball
1960 in Australian sport
1960
July 1960 sports events in Australia
August 1960 sports events in Australia